Bueng Krachap is a freshwater lake in Thailand, situated in the area of Nong Kop Subdistrict, Ban Pong District, Ratchaburi Province, regarded as the oldest and largest lake in the western region of Thailand.

Its name "Bueng Krachap", refers to "water caltrop marsh". Because there used to be may Krachap trees (water caltrop in Thai) in this area. Nowadays, although water caltrop have disappeared, the name "Bueng Krachap" is still used for this lake.

Presently, the lake is a freshwater fish breeding centre, and also a venue for water sports such as jet skiing and canoeing, with a resting place for locals and outsiders.

Around the lake, there are many restaurants to service tourists or locals that visit the place. It has a very beautiful view, especially at sundown.

Wat Bueng Krachap temple and its school are nearby places.

References 

Lakes of Thailand
Tourist attractions in Ratchaburi province